Portugal competed at the 2019 World Aquatics Championships in Gwangju, South Korea from 12 to 28 July.

Artistic swimming

Portugal entered two artistic swimmers.

Women

Open water swimming

Portugal qualified two male and one female open water swimmers.

Men

Women

Swimming

Portugal entered 10 swimmers.

Men

Women

References

World Aquatics Championships
Nations at the 2019 World Aquatics Championships
2019